Nizamuddin Subhani (born 10 November 1925) is an Afghan wrestler, who competed at the 1960 Summer Olympic Games in the heavyweight freestyle event. He was born in Kabul.

References

External links
 

1925 births
Possibly living people
Wrestlers at the 1960 Summer Olympics
Afghan male sport wrestlers
Olympic wrestlers of Afghanistan
Sportspeople from Kabul
Wrestlers at the 1958 Asian Games
Wrestlers at the 1962 Asian Games
Asian Games competitors for Afghanistan